Love is a Splendid Illusion is a 1970 British sex comedy concerning a businessman (Simon Brent) whose cheating ways come to a head in Italy when the secret lover of his equally cheating wife (Lisa Collings) turns out to be a potential business partner.

It was also known as Bed and Don't Tell.

Cast
Simon Brent - Christian Dubarry
Andrée Flamand  - Michelle Howard
Lisa Collings - Amanda Dubarry
Peter Hughes - Maurice Howard
Mark Kingston - Bernard Collins
Fiona Curzon - Liz
Maxine Casson - Debbie
Anna Matisse - Sophie
Carl Ferber - Jason
Nancy Nevinson - Amanda's Mother
Gay Soper - Blonde Girl in Red

References

External links
Love is a Splendid Illusion at IMDb

British sex comedy films
1970s sex comedy films
Films directed by Tom Clegg (director)
1970s English-language films